The 1788 Vermont Republic gubernatorial election took place throughout September, and resulted in the re-election of Thomas Chittenden to a one-year term.

The Vermont General Assembly met in Manchester on October 9. The Vermont House of Representatives appointed a committee to examine the votes of the freemen of Vermont for governor, lieutenant governor, treasurer, and members of the governor's council. In the race for governor, Thomas Chittenden was re-elected to his eleventh one-year term.

In the election for lieutenant governor Joseph Marsh was re-elected to a one-year term. The freemen re-elected Samuel Mattocks as treasurer, his third one-year term. The names of candidates and balloting totals were not recorded.

Results

References

Vermont gubernatorial elections
1788 in Vermont
1788 elections in North America